Nicolò Savona (born 19 March 2003) is an Italian footballer who plays as a right-back for the  club Juventus Next Gen.

Club career
Savona is a youth product of Aygreville, and moved to Juventus' youth academy at the age of 8. He had a loan with the S.P.A.L. academy for the 2020-21 season. A mainstay of their Primavera team, he signed his first professional contract with Juventus on 16 December 2021 until 2024. He made his professional debut with Juventus Next Gen in a 2–1 Serie C loss to Feralpisalò on 30 November 2022.

International career
Savona is a youth international for Italy, having played for the Italy U20s in a friendly tournament in June 2022.

References

External links
 
 FIGC Profile

2003 births
Living people
People from Aosta
Italian footballers
Italy youth international footballers
Juventus Next Gen players
Serie C players
Association football fullbacks